Comitas obtusigemmata is a species of sea snail, a marine gastropod mollusc in the family Pseudomelatomidae, the turrids and allies.

Description 
The length of the shell attains 22.5 mm, its diameter 9.5 mm.

(Original description) The thin shell is broadly fusiform, with a pyramidal spire and a rather long, slender siphonal canal. Its color is yellowish grey. The protoconch of the largest specimen is wanting,. The 6 remaining whorls are not very convex, but apparently so by a row of coarse, obtuse, rounded beads, near the base of upper whorls and the periphery of the body whorl, where they are 14 in number; a second row of small tubercles, rounded in upper whorls, having the character of oblique folds on lower ones, runs just below the deep suture, on a subsutural rib. The lower on the shell is lirate, 2 faint lirae in the interstices of the peripheral beads, 2 strong ones below the beads of the body whorl and numerous fainter ones on the base and the siphonal canal. The shell is covered with very fine growth lines. The body whorl is strongly attenuated below. The aperture is oval, angular above, ending in a rather long, narrow siphonal canal below. The peristome is thin, with a wide, rather shallow sinus above, then strongly protracted. The columellar margin is rather straight, directed to the left near and along the siphonal canal, with a thin layer of white enamel.

Distribution
This marine species occurs in the Arafura Sea and in the South China Sea.

References

External links
 
 
 Biolib.cz: Comitas obtusigemmata

obtusigemmata
Gastropods described in 1913